Milborne Port is a former parliamentary borough located in Somerset. It elected two members to the unreformed House of Commons between 1298 and 1307 and again from 1628, but was disenfranchised in the Reform Act 1832 as a rotten borough.

Members of Parliament

Milborne Port re-franchised in 1628

MPs 1640–1832

Notes

References
Robert Beatson, A Chronological Register of Both Houses of Parliament (London: Longman, Hurst, Res & Orme, 1807) 
D Brunton & D H Pennington, Members of the Long Parliament (London: George Allen & Unwin, 1954)
Cobbett's Parliamentary history of England, from the Norman Conquest in 1066 to the year 1803 (London: Thomas Hansard, 1808) 
 J Holladay Philbin, Parliamentary Representation 1832 – England and Wales (New Haven: Yale University Press, 1965)
 Henry Stooks Smith, The Parliaments of England from 1715 to 1847, Volume 3 (London: Simpkin, Marshall & Co, 1850)

See also 
 Milborne Port

Parliamentary constituencies in Somerset (historic)
Constituencies of the Parliament of the United Kingdom established in 1628
Constituencies of the Parliament of the United Kingdom disestablished in 1832
Rotten boroughs